Tommaso Palamidessi (February 16, 1915 – April 29, 1983) was an Italian esotericist. Drawn to astrology, parapsychology, and yoga-tantric doctrines, he was active in the field of the occult and developed a form of Esoteric Christianity that he called Archeosophy. In 1968, he founded the Archeosophical Society in Rome, which is still active and has several thousand members in Italy and the rest of Europe (mainly in Germany, Portugal, and France).

Biography

Youth and studies
Palamidessi was born in Pisa on 16 February 1915 to Carlo Palamidessi, an army officer, and Luigia Tagliata, a poet. In 1920, Palamidessi moved to Sicily. As a child, he studied astronomy, astrology, botany, medicine and religion, and as an adolescent he traveled to Tripoli and Tunis to pursue further study in Islamic Sufism.

Beginning in 1933, when he moved to Turin, Palamidessi pursued intensive research into astrology, alchemy and Tantric yoga, extrasensory experiences, Egyptology and the study of hieroglyphs—the latter carried out in collaboration with the director of the Egyptian Museum of Turin, Ernesto Scamuzzi. He also has out-of-body experiences, bilocations and remembrances of his past lives.

His publications about Tantric yoga include: The Occult Powers of Man and the Indo-Tibetan Tantric Yoga, Sexual Technique of Tantric Yoga; The Erotic Power of Kundalini Yoga; Yoga not to Die. During these years, he also wrote an extensive unpublished commentary on Egyptian theurgy and the Book of the Dead.

The forties and astrological works

Towards the end of the 1940s, Palamidessi began to teach astrology and yoga. He became one of the first Italian astrological authors of the 1900s. In the catalogue of the National Library Service, only six treatises of astrology written by Italian authors appear from 1900 to 1939. For the most these are general introductions and often mixed with chiromancy, physiognomy and occultism. In these years Tommaso Palamidessi wrote six astrological treatises: The Course of Stars and Man's Diseases; Medicine and Sidereal Influences; Mundane Astrology (1941); Cosmic Influences and the Precocious Diagnosis of Cancer (1943) Earthquakes, Eruptions and Cosmic influences (1943) and not forgetting the Perpetual Effemerides (1941)

In Italy during the 1900s the first volumes were dedicated to two disciplines : World astrology and medical astrology.  
At the time, Palamidessi established contacts with exponents of the Hamburg Astrologic School, to whom he dedicated an article in the journal Astral Language. Among the foreign contacts of Tommaso Palamidessi were French authors such as Alexandre Volguine (1903–1976), Henry Joseph Gouchon (1898-1978) and Jacques Reverchon (1909-1985). Like Reverchon, Gouchon gravitates around the journal Cahiers Astrologiques (1938-1983) founded by Volguine. 
The English writer and Anglican priest Francis Rolt-Wheeler (1876-1960) also collaborated with Palamidessi.

The fifties

In 1947 Tommaso Palamidessi married Rosa Francesca Bordino (1916–1999), with whom he had a daughter, Silvestra (1948–1996). In 1949 a spiritual crisis drove him to convert to Christianity and consequently he decided to suspend his yoga publications.

In 1953 he moved to Rome with his family and contributed to various newspapers, including Tribuna Illustrata, an Italian weekly magazine for whom he wrote a section about esotericism and astrology until 1969, when the magazine disappeared. He visited the monasteries of Kalambaka, Thessaly and Mt. Athos in 1957 and Jerusalem in the Easter of 1966, where he had special revelations on the Mt. Golgotha and in Gethsemane.

In Alexandria, Egypt he rediscovered archaeological sites that he had already seen during his paranormal experiences by which he had remembered to have been Origen (185-254), instructor at the Didaskaleyon, school of Christianity founded by the evangelist St. Mark in Alexandria. The study of Patristics consolidated his faith in what he regarded the authentic Esoteric Christianity. By this time his formulation of a new doctrinal synthesis for the spiritual awakening of man and woman took shape in Archeosofica.

The foundation of Archeosofica

On 29 September 1968 Tommaso Palamidessi founded Archeosofica, Esoteric School of High Initiation in Rome. The foundation of Archeosofica was rooted in Palamidessi's spirit of collaboration toward spiritual realizations.
Indeed, Tommaso Palamidessi founded Archeosofica as
a free school for free scholars, who must not feel like pupils nor apprentices, but brothers who listen to the living voice of other brothers.[...]

It is a call addressed to all, and it does not matter if they belong to the different communities (Theosophists, Anthroposophists, Martinists, Rosicrucians, Catholics, Yoghists, etc.). The Brotherhood is only one, and it can have only one verb: Love one another; only one Master: Jesus the Christ. 

In the following years, he journeyed to India, Kashmir, Nepal, China, and South America, but from 1968 forth his efforts were focused on the archeosophical doctrine and to the organisation of the many groups of study and experimentation that have soon spread all over Italy. Then in 1973 he founded a cultural association called Archeosophical Society with the aim of developing and diffusing Archeosophy all over the world.

Philosophy

Definition of Archeosophy

The archeosophical ascesis

The archeosophical ascesis aims at solving the religious problem of a correction of human life that does not rely on either one's whim or on chance, but on techniques of spiritual awakening and interior transmutation. The program includes special gymnastics, breathing techniques, psycho-dynamic actions on hormones and nerve plexus in order to ascend to what corresponds to body and, though not being body, makes up the whole of the energetic bodies permeating the organic one with the purpose of finally reaching the causal body where the immortal I resides. Out-of-body experiences (in order to have a direct, personal experience of spiritual worlds), methods of meditation on the centres of force directly linked with the three principles of the immortal Ego (such as the meditation on the heart defined by Palamidessi as cardiognosis or "inner knowledge of one's heart) and exercises of remembrance of some past lives are part of the itinerary of self-awareness and of the journey towards God. suggested by Archeosofica.

In his treatise Tecniche di Risveglio Iniziatico (Techniques of Initiatic Awakening) (Ed.Mediterranee 1975) Palamidessi presents a program of integral ascesis where techniques of meditation on the centres of force and on the divine names on the one hand, an intense inner life devoted to transcendence, on the other and finally a cautious use of astral influences in order to determine the most convenient moments for the ascetic practices, converge on the unique purpose of granting a spiritual regeneration in a Christic sense.

The artistic ascesis

A special form of ascesis is carried out through art.
Deeply interested in the mystical, theological and artistic tradition of the Eastern Orthodox Church, Palamidessi brings back to light the technique for preparing and painting a sacred icon. The work he dedicates to this subject, L'Icona, I colori e l'Ascesi Artistica (tr.: Icon, Colours and Artistic Ascesis) (published posthumously in 1986) is a real handbook which aims at starting the reader off on the personal preparation of a sacred icon and on meditating on it. By following the rules of the chromatic symbolism as well as the traditional geometry of sacred art, the artist can make of his own icon a "castle of meditation", by which he transcends the formal aspect of the image and becomes sensitive to the divine archetypes hidden behind it. In this sense the icon has a sanctifying effect on the conscience of the artist.

Another important key for the mystic and initiatic self-realisation included in the ascetic program of Archeosofica is linked with the discoveries made by Palamidessi over sacred music and its importance for the catharsis and the awakening of the spiritual centres in the regenerated man.

Works 

 Il Corso degli astri e le malattie nell'uomo: trattato teorico-pratico di cosmopatogenesi con 22 figure, Milan: F.lli Bocca, 1940 (2nd ed. Archeosofica 1985).
 La medicina e gli influssi siderali, Milan: F.lli Bocca, 1940.
 Astrologia mondiale: il destino dei popoli rivelato dal corso degli astri, Turin: T. Palamidessi, 1941 (2nd ed. Archeosofica 1985).
 Gli influssi cosmici e la diagnosi precoce del cancro, Turin: T. Palamidessi, 1943.
 Terremoti, eruzioni e influssi cosmici, Turin: T. Palamidessi, 1943.
 I poteri occulti dell'uomo e lo yoga tantrico indo-tibetano, Turin: Spartaco Giovene, 1945 (2nd ed. Archeosofica 1988, 3rd ed. ArkeiosISBN 9788886495233 ).
 La tecnica sessuale dello yoga tantrico indo-tibetano, Turin: Edizioni Grande Opera, 1948 (2nd ed. Archeosofica 1988, 3rd ed. Arkeios ).
 La potenza erotica di kundalini yoga: lo yoga del potere serpentino ed il risveglio dei ventuno chakra, Turin: Grande Opera, 1949.
 Lo yoga per non morire: metodi sperimentali indù per realizzare l'immortalità autocosciente, Turin: Grande Opera, 1949.
 L'alchimia come via allo spirito: l'autorealizzazione magica e la psicologia del profondo, svelate dalla tradizione ermetica, Turin: Grande Opera, 1949 (2nd ed. Arkeios 2001).
 Gli astri nella diagnosi e cura del cancro, Turin: Ed. Grande Opera, 1949.
 Tecniche di risveglio iniziatico: i centri di forza e la metafisica sperimentale, Rome : Edizioni Mediterranee, 1975 (2nd ed. 1983).
 Archeosofia, 5 volumes, Rome: Archeosofica, 1985-1988 (2nd ed. Arkeios 2001).  
 Il libro cristiano dei morti, Rome: Arkeios, 1985.
 Le basi della teologia sofianica : nuove indagini bibliche, Rome: Arkeios, 1986.
 L'icona, i colori e l'ascesi artistica: dottrina ed esperienze per una Via verso l'autosuperamento ed una coscienza divina nell'arte, Rome: Arkeios, 1986.
 Ricettario Erboristico, Rome: Arkeios, 1987.

See also 
 Archeosofica

References 

In English:

 Article " Archeosophy " by P.L. Zoccatelli in Peter B. Clarke (ed.), Encyclopedia of New Religious Movements, London - New York: Routledge, 2006, p. 38-39.

In Italian, German and French:

 Günter Bartsch, " Archäosophie – das neue Gralsrittertum ", in Materialdienst der Evangelischen Zentralstelle für Weltanschauungsfragen, 1989, 12, p. 369–371.
 Massimo Introvigne, Il Cappello del mago.I nuovi movimenti magici, dallo spiritismo al satanismo, Milan: Sugarco, 1990, p. 330-332 (French translation: La magie: les nouveaux mouvements magiques, Paris : Droguet et Ardant, 1993).
 Cecilia Gatto Trocchi, Magia ed esoterismo in Italia, Milano:Mondadori, 1990, p. 142-145.
 Antoine Faivre, L'ésotérisme, Paris : PUF, 1992, p. 102.
 Massimo Introvigne - Pier Luigi Zoccatelli (editors), Le religioni in Italia, Elledici - Velar, Leumann (Turin) - Gorle (Bergamo), 2006, p. 842-844.
 Francesco Baroni, " Tommaso Palamidessi et l'Archéosophie ", in La Tentation du secret, Groupes et sociétés initiatiques entre ésotérisme et politique du XVIIIème au XXème siècle, Politica Hermetica n° 21 (2007), p. 120-135.
 Francesco Baroni, "Julius Evola e Tommaso Palamidessi. Con una lettera inedita di Julius Evola", 2009 (http://www.fondazionejuliusevola.it/Documenti/Evola_Palamidessi.pdf).

Books:

 Francesco Baroni, Tommaso Palamidessi e l'Archeosofia. Vita ed opere di un esoterista cristiano, Foggia: Bastogi, 2011.

External links

Official sites
 Official site of Associazione Archeosofica in Italy
 American website of the Archeosophical Society
 German website of the Archeosophical Society
 Official site of Archeosofica
 American website of Archeosofica
 Portuguese website of Arqueosofica

1915 births
1983 deaths
20th-century astrologers
Esotericists
Italian astrologers
Italian astrological writers
Italian occult writers
Parapsychologists
Spiritual teachers
Italian Theosophists